35 Hudson Yards (also Tower E ) is a mixed-use skyscraper in Manhattan's West Side composed of apartment units and a hotel. Located near Hell's Kitchen, Chelsea, and the Penn Station area, the building is a part of the Hudson Yards project, a plan to redevelop the Metropolitan Transportation Authority's West Side Yards. As of November 2022, it was the 26th-tallest building in the United States.

History
The project was presented to the public for the first time in summer 2011. The tower is a part of the Hudson Yards Redevelopment Project, and is located at 11th Avenue and West 33rd Street. The building design was changed from a cylindrical to a rectangular prismatic shape in December 2013.

The construction of 35 Hudson Yards began in 2015 and was completed in 2019. A building permit application was filed in January 2015. In July 2016, the project received $1.2 billion in construction financing from UK hedge fund The Children's Investment Fund Management. 35 Hudson Yards topped out in June 2018. 

The building opened on March 15, 2019. The hotel opened in June. Bloomberg reported in August 2022 that Related was considering a sale of the hotel.

Architecture and design
The building was designed by David Childs of the architectural firm Skidmore, Owings & Merrill, which also provided structural engineering services. Jaros, Baum & Bolles was the MEP engineer, and Langan was the geotechnical engineer. Tishman Construction, a wholly owned subsidiary of AECOM, was general contractor.

Originally featured as a  tower with setbacks at various intervals, the building was redesigned in early December 2013 to feature a cylindrical "tube." Interiors were designed by Ingrao with Eucalyptus cabinetry and Quartzite countertops.

The tower was designed as a residential and a hotel tower. 35 Hudson Yards contains 11 floors dedicated to hotel space along with a sky lobby, a ballroom and a spa. A plaza is located at the foot of the tower and the tower also contains medical offices.

The first floor serves as the building's lobby. The lobby contains Flowers, a tapestry by Swedish artist Helena Hernmarck. Retail is on levels 2, 4, and 5 and will consist of an outpost of the Hospital for Special Surgery focused on physical therapy and a SoulCycle. Six floors of office space starts from level 8 that serve as the new headquarters for Related's subsidiary Equinox Fitness. The hotel, also managed by Equinox, has 212 rooms (including 48 suites) across and levels 24 through 38. Levels 3, 6, and 7 are home to a  gym and spa also operated by Equinox. The upper 36 floors contain 135 condominiums. Building amenities include a gym, yoga studio, meditation room, a lounge, and a golf-simulator. In August 2019, a new restaurant, Electric Lemon, opened on the 24th floor.

See also 
 List of tallest buildings in New York City
 Hudson Yards Redevelopment Project

References

External links 
 Hudson Yards
 New York City project website
 Related Companies project website
 Animation: building the platform while trains run through Brookfield properties, via Gothamist.com
 Hudson Yards news and developments
 

Chelsea, Manhattan
Hudson Yards, Manhattan
2019 establishments in New York City
2010s in Manhattan
Oxford Properties
Skyscraper hotels in Manhattan
Eleventh Avenue (Manhattan)
Hotel buildings completed in 2019
Residential buildings completed in 2019
Residential skyscrapers in Manhattan
Residential condominiums in New York City
Buildings developed by the Related Companies
Pencil towers in New York City